Rocallaura is a locality and decentralized municipal entity located in the municipality of Vallbona de les Monges, in Province of Lleida province, Catalonia, Spain. As of 2020, it has a population of 79.

Geography 
Rocallaura is located 67km east-southeast of Lleida.

References

Populated places in the Province of Lleida